Amedeus Msarikie (September 1931 – 7 February 2013) was the Roman Catholic bishop of Moshi, Tanzania.

Ordained to the priesthood in 1961, Msarikie was named bishop in 1986 and retired in 2007.

Notes

1931 births
2013 deaths
20th-century Roman Catholic bishops in Tanzania
21st-century Roman Catholic bishops in Tanzania
Roman Catholic bishops of Moshi